The men's 1500 metres (T54) at the 2018 Commonwealth Games, as part of the athletics programme, took place in the Carrara Stadium on 9 and 10 April 2018. The event was open to para-sport athletes competing under the T53 / T54 classifications.

Records
Prior to this competition, the existing world and Games records were as follows:

Schedule
The schedule was as follows:

All times are Australian Eastern Standard Time (UTC+10)

Results

First round
The first round consisted of two heats. The three fastest competitors per heat (plus four fastest losers) advanced to the final.

Heat 1

Heat 2

Final
The medals were determined in the final.

References

Men's 1500 metres (T54)